Strepsigonia diluta is a moth in the family Drepanidae. It is found in the north-eastern Himalaya, China, Taiwan, Java, Sumatra, Peninsular Malaysia, Borneo and Seram.

Adults are pale ochreous fawn with simply falcate (sickle-shaped) forewings in both sexes.

The larvae feed on the leaves of Engelhardia roxburgiana. Mature larvae curl a leaf and fix it with silk to pupate inside.

Subspecies
Strepsigonia diluta diluta
Strepsigonia diluta takamukui (Matsumura, 1927) (Taiwan)

References

Moths described in 1897
Drepaninae